Sangmyung University is a private university in South Korea. It consists of the first campus in Jongno District, Seoul and the second campus in Cheonan, Chungcheongnam-do. It was established in 1937, with the Sangmyung Women's College being founded in 1965, and the Sangmyung Women's College in Cheonan in 1985. In 1987, the college was promoted to a university and changed its name to Sangmyung Women's University. In 1996, it changed into coeducation and changed its name to Sangmyung University.

Symbols 
The symbolic deer has a complex meaning of love, ideal, and sacrifice. Plum blossoms are the cleanliness, the integrity and the expression of belief.

Location
Sangmyung University is located in Jongno, Seoul and Cheonan, Chungcheongnam-do. Jongno District is famous for origin of Seoul.

History

The university traces its beginnings to 1937 when the Japanese held control of the Korean peninsula. It was in this year that the Sangmyung Academy for Higher Learning for the Young was established with the hopeful objective of grooming future national leaders.

By 1965, the academy became a women's teacher's college and then a women's university in 1986. Ten years later, Sangmyung Women's University began to admit men. 2006 marked Sangmyung University's 10th anniversary as a co-educational institution. According to faculty members, students, alumni and members of the community, Sangmyung University's move to expand education opportunities to men as well as women has been a success. Library occupancy rates and graduate employment rates have increased since 1996. Male alumni have been largely responsible for the surge in alumni activities since Sangmyung went co-educational with the assistance of Kyoungsun Im.

Notable alumni

Jang Seung-jo

External links
Sangmyung University official home page (Korean)
Sangmyung University official home page (English)

 

Educational institutions established in 1937
Former women's universities and colleges
Universities and colleges in Seoul
Universities and colleges in South Chungcheong Province
1937 establishments in Korea
History of women in Korea
Jongno District
Cheonan